Guryongcheon or Guryong River may refer to:

Guryongcheon (Cheongwon County)
Guryongcheon (South Chungcheong Province)
Guryongcheon (Chungju)